Coatzacoalcos Municipality is a municipality in Veracruz, Mexico.

References

Municipalities of Veracruz